Abril is a Portuguese and Spanish name meaning "April".

People with the given name 
 Abril Conesa (born 2000), Spanish synchronized swimmer
 Abril Méndez, Venezuelan actress
 Abril Rodríguez (born 1986), Mexican beauty contestant
 Abril Schreiber (born 1990), Venezuelan actress

People with the surname 
 Antón García Abril (1933-2021), Spanish composer and musician
 Dolores Abril (born 1939), Spanish singer and actress
 Erika Abril (born 1978), Colombian Olympic long-distance runner
 Laura Abril (born 1990), Colombian cross-country mountain biker
 Richar Abril (born 1982), Cuban boxer
 Silvia Abril (born 1971), Spanish actress
 Victoria Abril (born 1959), Spanish actress
Vincent Abril (born 1995), French-Monégasque racing driver
 Xavier Abril (1905–1990), Peruvian poet and essayist
 Julio Abril (born 1971), Cuban businessman and entrepreneur

See also 

 April (given name)
 April (surname)
 Avril (name)
 Editora Abril, publisher
 Grupo Abril, Brazilian media group

References 

Spanish given names
Spanish-language surnames
Portuguese given names
Portuguese-language surnames